Saša Nikolić (born 30 April 1964) is a Serbian football manager and former player.

Playing career
After starting out at Dinamo Zagreb, Nikolić went on to play for Čelik Zenica during the 1988–89 Yugoslav First League. He lastly played for Železnik in the First League of FR Yugoslavia, before retiring from the game.

Managerial career
After serving as an assistant at Železnik, Nikolić took over as the club's manager in May 2002, replacing Goran Stevanović. He quickly proved his talent and was voted the best manager in FR Yugoslavia for 2002 in a poll organized by Politika. In August 2003, Nikolić parted ways with the club. He later briefly worked in China, before returning to Železnik as manager in November 2004. During the second part of the 2004–05 season, Nikolić served as the club's sporting director.

Later on, Nikolić managed numerous clubs, including Napredak Kruševac (October 2007–June 2008), Banat Zrenjanin (July–December 2008), Sloga Kraljevo (September–December 2009), Inđija (October–December 2010), Lokomotiv Plovdiv (April–June 2011),  Bežanija (October 2011–April 2012), Radnik Surdulica (September 2013–April 2014), and Loznica (December 2015–June 2016).

References

External links
 

1964 births
Living people
Sportspeople from Slovenj Gradec
Yugoslav footballers
Serbia and Montenegro footballers
Serbian footballers
Association football goalkeepers
FK Zvezdara players
NK Čelik Zenica players
FK Rudar Kakanj players
FK Železničar Beograd players
FK Železnik players
Yugoslav First League players
Second League of Serbia and Montenegro players
First League of Serbia and Montenegro players
Serbia and Montenegro football managers
Serbian football managers
FK Železnik managers
Henan Songshan Longmen F.C. managers
FK Napredak Kruševac managers
FK Banat Zrenjanin managers
FK Sloga Kraljevo managers
FK Inđija managers
PFC Lokomotiv Plovdiv managers
FK Bežanija managers
FK Radnik Surdulica managers
Serbian SuperLiga managers
Serbia and Montenegro expatriate football managers
Serbian expatriate football managers
Expatriate football managers in China
Expatriate football managers in Bulgaria
Serbia and Montenegro expatriate sportspeople in China
Serbian expatriate sportspeople in Bulgaria